Highcroft is a rural locality in the local government area (LGA) of Tasman in the South-east LGA region of Tasmania. The 2016 census recorded a population of 45 for the state suburb of Highcroft.

History 
Highcroft was gazetted as a locality in 1968.

Geography
Almost all of the boundaries are survey lines.

Road infrastructure 
Route B37 (Nubeena Road) passes to the north. From there, Stormlea Road provides access to the locality.

References

Towns in Tasmania
Localities of Tasman Council